Norris James Coleman (born September 27, 1961) is an American retired professional basketball player who was selected by the Los Angeles Clippers in the second round (38th pick overall) of the 1987 NBA draft. A 6'8" forward from Kansas State University, Coleman played in only one National Basketball Association (NBA) season.

Coleman played for the Clippers during the 1987–88 season, appearing in 29 games and scoring a total of 153 points.  Following his one season in the NBA, Coleman had a lengthy and successful career in foreign professional basketball leagues, principally in Israel.  He played with Hapoel Jerusalem during the 1992–93, 1993–94, and 1995–96 seasons, and with Maccabi Tel Aviv during the 1994–95 season. He was the 1994 Israeli Basketball Premier League MVP. Coleman continued to play in Israel in numerous teams until his retirement in 2001, with Hapoel Tel Aviv in the second league, at the age of 40.

College career
Coleman had an unusual collegiate career at Kansas State.  Because he had spent five years in the U.S. Army, Coleman was a 24-year-old freshman when he began play at K-State in the 1985–86 basketball season.  That season, Coleman led the Big Eight Conference in scoring with 21.8 points per game and pulled down 8 rebounds a game, on the way to being named first-team All-Conference and Newcomer of the Year.  In doing so, he became one of the few players to lead his league in scoring during his first season in college.   However, near the close of that season, the NCAA found that Coleman had not met the minimum high school requirements and K-State immediately declared him ineligible.

The saga took another twist in April 1986, when the NCAA issued an unusual ruling that said Coleman would have to sit out a year at K-State with no scholarship and surrender a year of eligibility, or transfer to a different school and face no penalties.  Coleman immediately received scholarship offers from 25 schools, and took recruiting trips to LSU, the University of Kentucky and the University of Virginia, but eventually decided to stay at Kansas State.  Early in the following basketball season, in November 1986, the NCAA reduced its penalty to a 12-game suspension, and Coleman returned to the court for the last 19 games of the 1986–1987 season, teaming with Mitch Richmond to help lead K-State to a berth in the 1987 NCAA tournament.  After averaging 20.7 points per game and 8.4 rebounds per game and again being named first team All-Conference in his shortened sophomore season, Coleman decided to turn pro.

Because of his career in the Army, Coleman was affectionately nicknamed "The Sarge" by Kansas State fans.

College statistics

|-
| style="text-align:left;"| 1985–86
| style="text-align:left;"| Kansas State
| 28 || 28 || 35.4 || .518 || — || .743 || 8.0 || .7 || .9 || .9 || 21.8
|-
| style="text-align:left;"| 1986–87
| style="text-align:left;"| Kansas State
| 19 || 12 || 32.3 || .508 || .077 || .752 || 8.4 || .4 || .9 || 1.4 || 20.7
|-
| style="text-align:center;" colspan="2"|Career
| 47 || 40 || 34.2 || .515 || .077 || .747 || 8.2 || .6 || .9 || 1.2 || 21.3
|-

References

External links

Database Basketball
The Draft Review
List of KSU basketball award-winners
ACB Profile @ ACB.com

1961 births
Living people
African-American basketball players
American expatriate basketball people in Argentina
American expatriate basketball people in France
American expatriate basketball people in Israel
American expatriate basketball people in Spain
American men's basketball players
Basketball players from Jacksonville, Florida
Bnei Hertzeliya basketball players
CB Gran Canaria players
Hapoel Jerusalem B.C. players
Hapoel Tel Aviv B.C. players
Ironi Ramat Gan players
Israeli Basketball Premier League players
Kansas State Wildcats men's basketball players
Liga ACB players
Los Angeles Clippers draft picks
Los Angeles Clippers players
Maccabi Givat Shmuel players
Maccabi Tel Aviv B.C. players
Military personnel from Florida
NCAA sanctions
Olympique Antibes basketball players
Peñarol de Mar del Plata basketball players
Power forwards (basketball)
Small forwards
United States Army soldiers
United States Basketball League players
American expatriate basketball people in the Philippines
Philippine Basketball Association imports
Pop Cola Panthers players
21st-century African-American people
20th-century African-American sportspeople